K. Varalakshmi (born 24 October 1948) is a Telugu short story writer.

Biography
She was born in Jaggampeta, East Godavari, Andhra Pradesh. She is the eldest daughter of Palla Venkata Ramana and Bangaramma. 

Her schooling was completed in Jaggampeta. Once financially settled, she finished her M.A. from Andhra University.

She is married to Kala Ramamohana Rao in 1964. They have three children. Their son, K. Ravindra Phaniraj is a Tourism Project consultant in Hyderabad. Her elder daughter, Dr. K. Geeta is a Telugu poetry writer. Their younger daughter, Sri Lalitha is also a story writer.

Most of her writings addresses the women of rural areas.

Awards

Poetry 
Sri Sri, Devulapalli KrishnaSastry, Kandukuri Rajyalakshmi and many more.

Story 
 Suseela Narayana Reddy award
 Chaso Spurthi award
 Vimalasanthi award
 Sahrudaya Sahiti award
 Hasan Fatima award
 Ranjani award
 Ajo-Vibho award
 Auto Katha award
 Tana Katha award
 Rangavalli award
 Pulikanti award
 R.S.Krishna Murthy award
 Dharmanidhi award from Telugu University
 Sri Peddibhotla Subbaramayya award and many more

Selected works

Story 
 Jeevaragam, 1996
 Matti-Bangaram, 2001
 Athadu-Nenu, 2007
 Kshatagatra, 2014
 Pittagullu, 2016

Poetry 
 Aame, 2002

Other writings 
Many more stories, poems, essays and  novels.
 Katha lonchi Katha (Serial)- koumudi patrika (from 2016)
 Na Jeevana Yaanamlo(Serial Autobiography) - vihanga patrika (from 2013 till date)

References 
 Athadu-Nenu

External links 
 telugurachayita.org
 teluguwriter.org

1948 births
Living people
Telugu writers
Women writers from Andhra Pradesh
Poets from Andhra Pradesh
People from East Godavari district
20th-century Indian women writers
20th-century Indian poets
Indian women poets
Telugu women writers